Westgate is an unincorporated community in northern Manitoba, Canada.

Westgate was originally settled as a logging community along the railroad line. At one point, the population was estimated to be as high as 110 people. A local mill produced lumber, fence posts and building timbers from 1940 up to 1975. The large mill is shut down but a smaller version is still operable, maintained by a local.

References  

Unincorporated communities in Northern Region, Manitoba